Amdapur is a village and panchayat in Ranga Reddy district, Telangana, India. It falls under Moinabad mandal.

References

Villages in Ranga Reddy district

The village has the famous Raktha Maisamma temple where hundreds of devotees flock on the weekends.